A Mars rover is a motor vehicle designed to travel on the surface of Mars. Rovers have several advantages over stationary landers: they examine more territory, they can be directed to interesting features, they can place themselves in sunny positions to weather winter months, and they can advance the knowledge of how to perform very remote robotic vehicle control. They serve a different purpose than orbital spacecraft like Mars Reconnaissance Orbiter. A more recent development is the Mars helicopter.

, there have been six successful robotically operated Mars rovers; the first five, managed by the American NASA Jet Propulsion Laboratory, were (by date of Mars landing): Sojourner (1997), Spirit (2004–2010), Opportunity (2004–2018), Curiosity (2012–present), and Perseverance (2021–present). The sixth, managed by the China National Space Administration, is Zhurong (2021–present).

On January 24, 2016, NASA reported that then current studies on Mars by Opportunity  and Curiosity would be searching for evidence of ancient life, including a biosphere based on autotrophic, chemotrophic or chemolithoautotrophic microorganisms, as well as ancient water, including fluvio-lacustrine environments (plains related to ancient rivers or lakes) that may have been habitable. The search for evidence of habitability, taphonomy (related to fossils), and organic carbon on Mars is now a primary NASA objective.

The Soviet probes, Mars 2 and Mars 3, were physically tethered probes; Sojourner was dependent on the Mars Pathfinder base station for communication with Earth; Opportunity, Spirit and Curiosity were on their own. As of February 2023, Curiosity is still active, while Spirit, Opportunity, and Sojourner completed their missions before losing contact. On February 18, 2021, Perseverance, the newest American Mars rover, successfully landed.  On May 14, 2021, China's Zhurong became the first non-American rover to successfully operate on Mars.

Missions

Multiple rovers have been dispatched to Mars:

Active 
  Curiosity of the Mars Science Laboratory (MSL) mission by NASA, was launched November 26, 2011 and landed at the Aeolis Palus plain near Aeolis Mons (informally "Mount Sharp") in Gale Crater on August 6, 2012. The Curiosity rover is still operational as of February 2023.

  Perseverance, NASA rover based on the successful Curiosity design. Launched with the Mars 2020 mission on July 30, 2020, it landed on February 18, 2021. It carried the Mars Helicopter Ingenuity attached to its belly.

  Zhurong launched with the Tianwen-1 CNSA Mars mission on July 23, 2020, landed on May 14, 2021 in the southern region of Utopia Planitia, and deployed on May 22, 2021, while dropping a remote selfie camera on 1 June, 2021. As of February 2023, it is suspected that Zhurong has failed to wake up after the Mars winter and its mission has ended.

Past 

 Sojourner rover, Mars Pathfinder, landed successfully on July 4, 1997. Communications were lost on September 27, 1997.

  Spirit (MER-A), Mars Exploration Rover (MER), launched on June 10, 2003, and landed on January 4, 2004. Nearly 6 years after the original mission limit, Spirit had covered a total distance of  but its wheels became trapped in sand. The last communication received from the rover was on March 22, 2010, and NASA ceased attempts to re-establish communication on May 25, 2011.

  Opportunity (MER-B), Mars Exploration Rover, launched on July 7, 2003 and landed on January 25, 2004. Opportunity surpassed the previous records for longevity at 5,352 sols (5498 Earth days from landing to mission end; 15 Earth years or 8 Martian years) and covered . The rover sent its last status on 10 June 2018 when a global 2018 Mars dust storm blocked the sunlight needed to recharge its batteries. After hundreds of attempts to reactivate the rover, NASA declared the mission complete on February 13, 2019.

Failed
  Mars 2, PrOP-M rover, 1971, Mars 2 landing failed taking Prop-M with it. The Mars 2 and 3 spacecraft from the Soviet Union had identical 4.5 kg Prop-M rovers. They were to move on skis while connected to the landers with cables.
  Mars 3, PrOP-M rover, landed successfully on December 2, 1971.  rover tethered to the Mars 3 lander. Lost when the Mars 3 lander stopped communicating about 110 seconds after landing. The loss of communication may have been due to the extremely powerful Martian dust storm taking place at the time or an issue with the Mars 3 orbiter's ability to relay communications.

Planned
     The European-Russian ExoMars rover Rosalind Franklin was confirmed technically ready for launch in March 2022 and planned to launch in September 2022, but due to the suspension of cooperation with Roscosmos this is delayed and a fast-track study was started to determine alternative launch options.

Proposed
   The JAXA Melos rover was supposed to be launched in 2022. JAXA has not given an update since 2015.
  NASA Mars Geyser Hopper
  ISRO has proposed a Mars rover as part of MOM-3, its third Mars mission in 2030.

Undeveloped
 Marsokhod was proposed to be a part of Russian Mars 96 mission.
 Astrobiology Field Laboratory, proposed in the 2000-2010 period as a follow on to MSL.
 Mars Astrobiology Explorer-Cacher (MAX-C), cancelled 2011
 Mars Surveyor 2001 rover
 Mars Tumbleweed Rover, a spherical wind-propelled rover.
 In 2018, a kind of cushion-air rover was proposed, which in contrast with traditional hovercraft does not use blowers to pressurize the gas in the chamber but rather uses stored pressurized CO2 obtained from a freezing process which does not require mechanical compression.

Timeline of rover surface operations

Examples of instruments

Examples of instruments onboard landed rovers include:
 Alpha particle X-ray spectrometer (MPF + MER + MSL)
 CheMin (MSL)
 Chemistry and Camera complex (MSL)
 Dynamic Albedo of Neutrons (MSL)
 Hazcam (MER + MSL + M20)
 MarsDial (MER + MSL + M20)
 Materials Adherence Experiment (MPF)
 MIMOS II (MER)
 Mini-TES (MER)
 Mars Hand Lens Imager (MSL)
 Navcam (MER + MSL + M20+TW1)
 Pancam (MER)
 Rock Abrasion Tool (MER)
 Radiation assessment detector (MSL)
 Rover Environmental Monitoring Station (MSL)
 Sample Analysis at Mars (MSL)
 EDL cameras on Rover (MSL + M20+TW1) 
Cachecam (M20) 
 Mastcam-Z (M20) 
 MEDA (M20) 
 Microphones (M20+TW1) 
 MOXIE (M20) 
 PIXL (M20) 
 RIMFAX (M20)
 SHERLOC (M20) 
 SuperCam (M20) 
  Remote Camera (TW1)

Mars landing locations

NASA Mars rover goals

Circa the 2010s, NASA had established certain goals for the rover program.

NASA distinguishes between "mission" objectives and "science" objectives. Mission objectives are related to progress in space technology and development processes. Science objectives are met by the instruments during their mission in space.

The science instruments are chosen and designed based on the science objectives and goals. The primary goal of the Spirit and Opportunity rovers was to investigate "the history of water on Mars".

The four science goals of NASA's long-term Mars Exploration Program are:
 Determine whether life ever arose on Mars
 Characterize the climate of Mars
 Characterize the geology of Mars
 Prepare for human exploration of Mars

Gallery

See also

 Astrobiology
 Comparison of embedded computer systems on board the Mars rovers
 Crewed Mars rover
 InSight lander
 List of artificial objects on Mars
 List of missions to Mars
 List of rovers on extraterrestrial bodies
 Mars Exploration Rover
 Mars-Grunt
 Mars Pathfinder
 Mars Reconnaissance Orbiter
 2001 Mars Odyssey
 Moon rover
 Lunar Roving Vehicle
 Radiation hardening
 Scientific information from the Mars Exploration Rover mission

References

External links
 NASA official Mars Rover website
 Mars Pathfinder Gallery (NASA)
 All Rovers on Mars

Mars
+rovers
 
Landers (spacecraft)
Mars robots